Ian "Hixie" Hickson is the author and maintainer of the Acid2 and Acid3 tests, the WHATWG HTML 5 specification, and the Pingback specification, and the early working draft of Web Applications 1.0. He is known as a proponent of Web standards, and has played a crucial role in the development of specifications such as CSS. Hickson was a co-editor of the CSS 2.1 specification.

Hickson was born in Geneva, Switzerland, and lived there for ten years. He studied physics at the University of Bath in England. Later he was employed at Netscape and Opera Software; he now works for Google in the San Francisco Bay Area, and is the specification editor of the Web Hypertext Application Technology Working Group (WHATWG).

References

External links
 Ian Hickson's website
 Ian Hickson's blog

World Wide Web Consortium
Living people
Acid tests
Scientists from Geneva
English expatriates in Switzerland
Year of birth missing (living people)
Alumni of the University of Bath
British computer programmers
Swiss computer programmers
Swiss expatriates in England
Netscape people
Google people
Opera Software employees